The Bathing Venus is a bronze sculpture attributed to Giambologna (1529-1608), the leading late Renaissance sculptor in Europe. It was most likely created for King Henri IV of France with other bronzes as a diplomatic gift from Ferdinando I de’ Medici, Grand Duke of Tuscany, to embellish the gardens of the Royal castle in Saint-Germain-en-Laye. A Mercury in the Louvre, recently attributed to Hans Reichle and Giambologna's Triton in the Metropolitan Museum of Art were likely to have been also part of this grand-ducal gift. Documents relating to the commission have recently been discovered in the Florentine State Archives.

To enhance the erotic attraction of the female nude, the artist has contrived that the goddess hides her face behind her raised arm holding up a vessel, with which she is bathing. With the other hand she dries herself with a handkerchief. The viewer can approach her without entering her line of sight and, when in front of her, there is a moment of reciprocal discovery. The seated statue is a second, remodelled and rethought version of a marble Venus by the same artist, today in the J. Paul Getty Museum. The two versions show so many similarities that they clearly derive from a common source – most likely a full-scale model, a "modello in grande“. It is documented that Giambologna followed the practice of making full-scale models and keeping them in his workshop.

The bronze Venus was discovered in the late 1980s in the possession of a scrap-metal dealer near Paris, who seemed to have obtained it from the demolition of the Château de Chantemesle (sometimes spelt Chantemerle) in Corbeil-Essonnes, in the south-eastern suburbs of Paris, in the early 1960s. It was at first catalogued as a later copy after the Getty Venus, but recent research has attributed it to Giambologna.

Subject 
The subject of a nude, bathing female figure has been a topos of ancient art. One of the most famous examples is the Crouching Venus, a Hellenistic model of Venus surprised at her bath. The goddess Venus in Roman times embodies beauty, desire, sexuality, fertility, femininity, love and victory ("Venus Victrix"). As Venus Genetrix, the mythological ancestor to Julius Caesar, she played a central role in the political representation of the Julio-Claudian dynasty. The rebirth of the gods of antiquity in the monumental sculpture of the Renaissance took place relatively late, significantly later than in painting. In monumental sculpture, Jacopo Sansovino (1486-1570) seems to have been the first modern sculptor to bring them back to life and to make two figures of Venus, now lost. Towards the middle of the 16th century the imitation of ancient sculptures of Venus became diffused in contemporary creations. The ancient image of the goddess found true rebirth with Giambologna, who tackled all the types of ancient representation known at the time and who made it a fundamental subject in his art. His figures of the goddess are possibly the only ones to have achieved the status of the great models from antiquity.  

The bronze Bathing Venus holds her raised hand with a beaker in front of her face, blocking her sightline. The viewer can therefore approach the goddess without being noticed by Venus. Only when right in front of her can one see all her feminine attributes and a mutual discovery can take place. The motif of the raised left leg is an allusion to the typology of the ancient Venus removing her sandals. Not only does Giambologna borrow from ancient Venuses the game of simultaneously hiding and revealing, he now manifests a particular delight in the indiscreet observation of the female nude matching the courtly taste of the late Renaissance.

Attribution 
The attribution of the bronze Bathing Venus (Bronze) to Giambologna is based on the style of the figure. The sculpture shows stylistic features as they do appear on many other statues in Giambologna's oeuvre. This has been demonstrated by a comparison of particular details following the standard method of Giovanni Morelli (1816-1891): For example, the modelling of the Bathing Venus's cloth matches the modelling of the folds of Giambologna's presentation model of St. Matthew (Orvieto, Museo dell'opera del Duomo). The hair of the goddess strongly compares to the modelling of Giambologna's "Fiorenza" (Florence, Villa La Petraia). Yet all these comparative details of the bronze Venus as well as its comparisons cannot be found on the Getty marble Venus, as the artist had two different styles for marbles and for bronze works. Typical for the bronze works by Giambologna  

is the partial use of ‘unfinished’ (non-finito) areas. It is a stylistic device that Giambologna adopted from Donatello and which he used for his bronze sculptures throughout his career. Its crucial importance for the understanding of Giambologna's style has been analysed by recent scientific research. Typically, the garment of the bronze Bathing Venus was deliberately left unfinished in parts, creating liveliness by contrasts of texture.

The Ornament on the Base 
The base shows French ornament of the period of Henri IV. Its appearance on a figure made by the Florentine court sculptor is explained by its being destined to be a diplomatic gift to the king of France. The Florentine agents at the court of Henri IV sent regular reports of the king's tastes back to the Medici court. The same ornament can be found on the facade of the Grande Galerie of the Louvre, begun in 1595, one of the most important buildings erected by Henri IV. The Grande Galerie was built by the same architects as the Chateau-Neuf de Saint-Germain-en-Laye, the presumed destination of the bronze Venus

The Founder's Signature 
Following an old established tradition in European works of metal, the bronze Venus is signed by its founder, Gerhardt Meyer: “ME FECIT GERHARDT MEYER HOLMIAE“ (“Gerhardt Meyer made me in Stockholm“). On the small block upon which the right foot of the bronze Venus rests, one can also read the exact day of casting: ANNO 1597 / Den 25 Novembe[r] (“In the Year 1597 on 25 November“). The founder's signature is a sign of recognition of the very great skill required in casting a large bronze. Gerhardt Meyer was a member of a well-known dynasty of founders, working around the Baltic Sea in Riga, Stockholm, Copenhagen and Helsingör between the late 16th and the late 18th century. Several generations of the family bore the Christian name Gerhardt and they all signed with the same traditional formula: ME FECIT GERHARDT MEYER.

The Latin wording of the founder's signature on the bronze Venus contains an obvious mistake by apparently stating that the statue was created in Stockholm. In 1597 the statue cannot have been made in Stockholm (Latin: Holmia), as its casting model could only have been in Florence. The formula of the signature must be considered like a present-day brand, as confirmed by A. Zaijc (Austrian Academy of Science) and Charles Avery, which the craftsman punched routinely with a pre-existing set of punches. Craftsmen and artists were usually ignorant of Latin, and in this case this is confirmed by Meyer giving the casting date in his mother tongue German instead of in Latin. The formula was used later even in cases where the indication of HOLMIAE (Latin for “at Stockholm”) should have been replaced with HOLMIĀ (or HOLMIENSIS), referring to the origin of the caster. The same error occurs in the signatures of Giambologna and of one of his foremost pupils, Pietro Francavilla, when they want to state their Flemish origin (Latin: BELGĀ), but erroneously indicate that the figures in question have been made ‘in Belgium’ (Latin: BELGIAE) instead of their real place of manufacture, Florence. Founders were one of the most itinerant professions at the time. Meyer is documented in Stockholm 1592-95 and must be identical with a “Gerardo fiamingho” who appears in Florence in February 1598.

The Dating of “1597” and its Evidence 
The German art-historian Dorothea Diemer has claimed since 1999 that the indication of the year in the founder's signature 1597 should be read as 1697. Diemer's hypothesis is based on her interpretation of the 5, which she believes to have been originally a 6 on the casting model, which accidentally should have transformed itself during the casting process into a 5. 

This allows her to judge the bronze Venus as a Swedish aftercast of the marble Getty Venus, in her opinion executed by a later member of the Meyer family of casters, Gerhardt Meyer IV (1667-1710). The first publication of the bronze Venus, in the Catalogue of Italian Sculpture in the J. Paul Getty Museum, was based on her opinion, even though it had already at the time been contradicted by the technical data made available by the Getty Research Institute. Diemer, together with Linda Hinners, repeated her claim in an article in the Burlington Magazine in 2018. 

Diemer's theory has been qualified by the Uffizi Gallery, Florence as technically not verifiable and entirely speculative. The claim that the bronze Venus might be an aftercast of the Getty-marble had already been disproved. Peggy Fogelman observed in 2002: “A comparison of measurements reveals that some dimensions of the marble original are actually smaller than those of the bronze copy, while others are larger. This inconsistent relationship between measurements of the sculptures suggests that the bronze was not cast from moulds of the marble.“ Moreover, the surface of the bronze reproduces traces of a clay model, which could not happen if it were an aftercast. The quality of the bronze makes it impossible to put it into the same group as the known Swedish aftercasts of around 1700. 

The manufacture date of 1597 has also been proven by results of technical and palaeographical analysis:

Of the indication of the year, three numbers: 1, 7, and 9, are punched whereas the 5 is engraved. The reason for this is a casting fault underneath, a so-called Lunker, which made the material so thin in this spot that punching in a letter would have created a hole. This Lunker can be seen with the naked eye and has been further proven in the year 2012 by a computer-tomography made by the Fraunhofer Institut (Fürth). In 1996, the renowned art historian Gino Corti wrote: “It is really ANNO 1597, and in the next line it is: 25 Novembe, even if the two 5s are a bit different: for me there is no doubt.” Up until the 18th century, there existed two equivalent forms of the number 5: one with and one without stroke on the top. The use of two different forms of the same number or letter is no rarity in old inscriptions.

Peter Dreyer, a former keeper of the Pierpont Morgan Library & Museum in New York, writes in his palaeographical study of the bronze Venus's signature: "The small detail of an apex marking the endpoint of the curve of the five, overlooked so far, is clearly visible in all unmanipulated illustrations, also in that of the New York Times. It decides about the correct reading of the epigraphic date on the bronze Venus. It reads, unequivocally, 1597."      

The palaeographical result corresponds to the technical TL-dating of the core material. This evidence has shown with a probability of 99.7% that the casting of the bronze took place before 1648. Tests were carried out by the Rathgen Research Laboratory of the Berlin State Museums (1996), commissioned by the J. Paul Getty Museum, confirmed by Oxford Authentication, Wantage (2008), and re-checked by Professor Ernst Pernicka at the Curt-Engelhorn-Center for Archaeometry in Mannheim (2013).

Recent Research 
The bronze Venus has been included in the exhibition "Plasmato dal Fuoco. La scultura in bronzo nella Firenze degli ultimi Medici” (Forged in Fire. The bronze sculpture in the Florence under the last Medici) (Florence, Palazzo Pitti, 18 September 2019 until 12 January 2020) as an autograph work by Giambologna. In the catalogue entry the director of the Uffizi and curator of the exhibition, Eike D. Schmidt calls the bronze Bathing Venus a masterpiece of 16th century Italian art. Regarding the argument over the attribution between Diemer and Rudigier in the Burlington Magazine, he considers Diemer's hypothesis as entirely disproved. This view is shared by the scholars Charles Avery, Bertrand Jestaz and Lars-Olof Larsson, who have all given written statements. These three scholars participated in the ground-breaking Giambologna exhibition in 1978 (Edinburgh, London, Vienna). The inclusion of the Bathing Venus in the Florentine exhibition provoked a polemic initiated by a journalist of the New York Times from November 2019 titled “Is it a ‘5’ or a ‘6’? The answer could make an art fortune“. In this article Diemer accused Eike D. Schmidt to have significantly increased the market value of the piece by exhibiting it in the Pitti exhibition. In response, the Uffizi issued a press release on 27 November 2019, insisting that the bronze Venus is a masterpiece by Giambologna.  On 13 December 2019, the New York Times was criticized for having misrepresented the case by the Frankfurter Allgemeine Zeitung.

The Italian art historian Sandro Bellesi, who co-curated the exhibition "Plasmato dal Fuoco. The bronze sculpture in the Florence of the last Medici", published the statue as a refined work by Giambologna, cast by Meyer in the artist's workshop in 1597. In view of the article in The New York Times, Peter Dreyer summarized: "The decision about the correct reading of the date is neither the business of opinion nor of apodictic statements. It is exclusively due to the only scholarly discipline concerned with the reading of old texts: paleography."

In his review of Rudigier's and Truyols' book, the British art historian Robert Wenley wrote: "To every strand of the case against an earlier date and Giambologna’s direct involvement, Rudigier robustly presents a counter-claim." The German expert for Florentine Renaissance sculpture, Nicole Hegener, considers the re-discovery of the Bathing Venus as "the kind of sensation that occurs only once a century".

In 2021, Peter Dreyer reflected in detail on the recent research on the Bathing Venus and concluded that Diemer, together with Linda Hinners as well as Dimitrios Zikos, the advocates of the reading "1697" and critics of the attribution to Giambologna, should take note of new research and rethink their own methodology: "Strong circumstantial historic evidence spoke in favour of Diemer’s reading of the date and the consequent conclusions. Circumstantial evidence, however, can prove wrong, if new evidence turns up. It did so subsequently when another Gerdt (Gerhardt) Meyer was found to be documented in Stockholm from 1592 to 1595, who was probably the same Gerhardt Meyer who in 1596 cast the monumental Paschal candelabrum in St Peter’s church in Riga in the workshop of his kinsman Hans Meyer. And there is no reason to doubt the possibility of identifying him with the “Gherardo fiammingho” mentioned in 1598 in the documents of the Compagnia di Santa Barbara in Florence or with the Gerhardt Meyer who cast the bronze Venus." Moreover, Dreyer pointed out that “art historical work is missing in Diemer’s and Hinner’s merely historical approach", i.e renouncing stylistic analysis as the indispensable basis of an art historical attribution. 
Dreyer insisted on two objective facts, which cannot be ignored. Firstly, the result of the comparative measurements of the Getty marble and the bronze Venus: "The shrinking of the cooling bronze leads to an overall smaller size than that of the model from which it is taken. With the bronze Venus in question, this is not always the case in regard to the Getty marble. On the contrary, several details are even bigger in the bronze, as exact measurements taken separately and carefully by the Getty Museum ... prove. Therefore, the bronze cannot have been cast after the marble, which, in addition, makes Diemer’s word for word interpretation of the signature doubtful." Secondly, the correct reading of the annual in the founder's signature based on palaeographic evidence: "The second digit of the date is a 5 and could not have been punched with the tool used for the following 9 as Diemer and Hinners believed they could conclude in 2018 and tried to show in their manipulated photograph... The small detail of an apex marking the end point of the curve of the 5, overlooked so far, is clearly visible in all unmanipulated illustrations. It is decisive evidence about the correct reading of the epigraphic date on the bronze Venus. In accordance with the results of art history, it reads, unequivocally, 1597."

References

Literature 

P. Fogelman, P. Fusco and M. Cambarari, eds.: Italian and Spanish Sculpture, Catalogue of the J. Paul Getty Museum Collection, Los Angeles 2002.
 
A. Rudigier, B. Truyols, with a foreword by B. Jestaz: “Jean Bologne et les jardins d’Henri IV“, Bulletin monumental 174, 3 (2016), pp. 247–373.

D. Diemer, L. Hinners: “Gerhardt Meyer made me in Stockholm”: a bronze “Bathing woman” after Giambologna’, The Burlington Magazine 160 (2018), pp. 545–53.
 
A. Rudigier, B. Truyols: “Giambologna. Court Sculptor to Ferdinando I. His art, his style and the Medici gifts to Henri IV“ (2019) pp. 44–129.

 

Sculptures in Italy

Sculptures of Venus